= 1997 Czech Social Democratic Party leadership election =

Czech party leadership election

1997 ČSSD leadership election
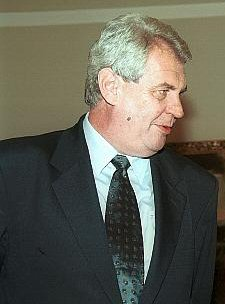
Candidate	Miloš Zeman
Percentage	72%
Leader of ČSSD before election
Miloš Zeman
Elected Leader of ČSSD
Miloš Zeman

The Czech Social Democratic Party (ČSSD) leadership election of 1997 was held in March 1997. Miloš Zeman received 72% of votes and was reelected. Zeman was the only candidate but he had to face opposition led by Karel Machovec.
